"The Right Stuff" is a song by Bryan Ferry, the former lead vocalist for Roxy Music. It was released as the first single from his seventh solo studio album Bête Noire (1987), being Ferry's twenty-fifth single. It was the album's only Top 40 hit in the U.K., peaking at No. 37.

Background
The song was co-written by Johnny Marr and adapted from "Money Changes Everything", the Smiths' instrumental B-side to "Bigmouth Strikes Again". When Marr was asked about the collaboration in a 1989 interview with Sonics he said "He [Ferry] didn’t know who I was. But he was looking for co-writers and someone suggested me to him. Someone played him some Smiths records and he went 'Oh, this guy plays guitar all right!' So he invited me down to the studio. Bryan Ferry was an old hero of mine and it was great to work with him, but the end result was…he’s a bit blow-waved." Guy Pratt, who played bass with Ferry during this period tells it differently in his book. Ferry heard "Money Changes Everything" and had the idea of putting vocals on it. Their then guitar player Chester Kamen, "could play the intro, but couldn't play it" and so Ferry enlisted Marr himself to play on the track.

References

External links
 

1987 singles
1987 songs
Songs written by Bryan Ferry
Songs written by Johnny Marr